Joseph Isaakovich Meerzon (October 31, 1894 – February 10, 1938) was a Bundist and later Soviet politician. He was educated at Moscow State University. He joined the Communist Party of the Soviet Union in 1918 and started as Secretary of the District Committee. From August 1919 to September 1920 he was Chairman of the Vitebsk gubernatorial Committee. He was Secretary of the responsible Tula gubernatorial Committee from December 1920 to May 1923. During the Great Purge, he was arrested on October 10, 1937, sentenced to death by the Military Collegium of the Supreme Court of the USSR on February 8, 1938 and executed by firing squad two days later. After the death of Joseph Stalin, he was posthumously rehabilitated in 1955.

Bibliography 
 Przewodnik po historii Partii Komunistycznej i ZSRR (ros.)
 http://www.sakharov-center.ru/asfcd/martirolog/?t=page&id=10988 (ros.)

1894 births
1938 deaths
Great Purge victims from Russia
Bundists
Soviet politicians
Soviet Jews
Jews executed by the Soviet Union
People executed by firing squad
Communist Party of the Soviet Union members
Soviet rehabilitations